Air Commodore Thomas Charles Reginald Higgins,  (21 July 1880 – 22 September 1953) was an early British aviator and senior Royal Flying Corps commander during the First World War. He was one of the small number of Royal Flying Corps generals in latter stages of the 
War.

Career

Higgins initially served in the Royal Navy, but on 14 March 1900 he joined the British Army and commissioned as a second lieutenant in The King's Own (Royal Lancaster Regiment). He saw active service in the Transvaal, Natal and on the Zululand Frontier during the Second Boer War, and was promoted to lieutenant on 25 July 1900. From 1904 to 1909 Higgins was seconded to overseas service as part of the West African Frontier Force. After his return to Great Britain, Higgins learnt to fly in 1911, gaining Royal Aero Club Certificate No. 88.

After flying duties in the Royal Flying Corps in 1915, Higgins was appointed to increasing senior posts, commanding No. 39 Squadron, the Home Defence Wing and from September 1917 the Home Defence Brigade.

Remaining in the Royal Air Force after the First World War, Higgins served as Director of Training at the Air Ministry, Chief Staff Officer in Iraq and Air Officer Commanding No. 10 Group before retiring towards the end of 1929.

References
Air of Authority – A History of RAF Organisation – Air Commodore T C R Higgins

|-

1880 births
1953 deaths
19th-century Royal Navy personnel
British Army personnel of the Second Boer War
Companions of the Order of St Michael and St George
Companions of the Order of the Bath
King's Own Royal Regiment officers
Royal West African Frontier Force officers
Royal Flying Corps officers
Royal Air Force generals of World War I
Royal Air Force personnel of World War II
British Army personnel of World War I